was a Ryukyuan lord (Aji) of Nakijin Castle. He was also known by his Chinese style name, .

Nakijin Chōyō was the second son of Nakijin Chōton. After his elder brother Nakijin Chōkō died without heir, he succeeded  in 1596.

In the spring of 1609, Satsuma invaded Ryukyu. Soon the castle was captured, and Nakijin Chōyō was killed in the battle.

References

1582 births
1609 deaths
Aji (Ryukyu)
16th-century Ryukyuan people
17th-century Ryukyuan people